Steve O'Neill (1891–1962) was an American baseball catcher.

Steve O'Neill may also refer to:

Steve O'Neill (owner) (1899–1983), American businessman and baseball team owner
Steve O'Neill (rugby league), English former rugby league footballer who played in the 1970s, 1980s and 1990s, and coached in the 1990s and 2000s

See also
Stephen O'Neill (born 1980), Irish footballer
Steve O'Neal (born 1946), American football player